Jelena Čubrilo (born 9 January 1994) is a Serbian footballer, who plays as a forward for STurkish Women's Football Super League club Fatih Vatan Spor and the Serbia women's national team.

Club career 
Čubrilo has played for Spartak Subotica, with whom she has played the Champions League.

Jelena in 2020 returned to Gintra Universitetas and play for Lithuanian champions in Lithuanian A lyga; scored 25 goals in 17 matches.

In January 2023, she moved to Turkey and signed with Fatih Vatan Spor to play in the second half of the 2022–23 Super League.

International career 
Čubrilo was an under-19 international for Serbia.

References

External links 
 

1994 births
Living people
Footballers from Belgrade
Women's association football midfielders
Serbian women's footballers
Serbia women's international footballers
Primera División (women) players
Rayo Vallecano Femenino players
ŽFK Spartak Subotica players
Gintra Universitetas players
Serbian expatriate women's footballers
Serbian expatriate sportspeople in Croatia
Expatriate women's footballers in Croatia
Serbian expatriate sportspeople in Lithuania
Expatriate women's footballers in Lithuania
Serbian expatriate sportspeople in Spain
Expatriate women's footballers in Spain
Serbian expatriate sportspeople in Turkey
Expatriate women's footballers in Turkey
Turkish Women's Football Super League players
Fatih Vatan Spor players